American Music Records is a jazz record company and label that was established by Bill Russell in 1944.

Russell produced new recordings and reissues, concentrating on New Orleans jazz musicians such as Bunk Johnson, George Lewis, Baby Dodds, and Wooden Joe Nicholas. In 1957 Storyville Records produced American Music's reissues on vinyl LP, as did the Japanese label Dan. Starting in 1989, George Buck's Jazzology group began releasing the back catalog on its American Music CD series.

Roster

Musicians on the "Yellow Series" of American Music Records included:

 Emile Barnes
 Albert Burbank
 Louis Nelson Delisle
 Baby Dodds
 Natty Dominique
 Cie Frazier
 George Guesnon
 Darnell Howard
 Kid Howard
 Albert Jiles
 Bunk Johnson
 Louis Keppard
 George Lewis
 Charlie Love
 Louis "Kid Shots" Madison
 Lawrence Marrero
 Herb Morand
 Louis Nelson
 Wooden Joe Nicholas
 Alcide Pavageau
 Jim Robinson
 Johnny St. Cyr
 Kid Thomas Valentine

Musicians on other series included:

 Alvin Alcorn
 Red Allen
 George Baquet
 Louis Barbarin
 Paul Barbarin
 Polo Barnes
 Sidney Bechet
 Barney Bigard
 Peter Bocage
 John Brunious
 Raymond Burke
 Cag Cagnolatti
 Mutt Carey
 John Casimir
 Papa Celestin
 Kid Clayton
 Kid Sheik
 Joe Darensbourg
 Eureka Brass Band
 Pops Foster
 Minor Hall
 Captain John Handy
 Percy Humphrey
 Willie Humphrey
 Clifford "Snags" Jones
 Punch Miller
 Albert Nicholas
 Olympia Brass Band
 Kid Ory
 Billie Pierce and De De Pierce
 Alton Purnell
 Kid Rena
 Emanuel Sayles
 Muggsy Spanier
 Albert Warner
 Johnny Wiggs
 Buster Wilson

See also
List of record labels

References

External links

Jazz record labels
American independent record labels
Record labels established in 1944
Reissue record labels
American record labels